Aeroexpresos Ejecutivos, C.A., Is a company specialized in passenger transportation and cargo transportation. It's located in Caracas, Venezuela.

Subsidiaries 

Passenger Transportation
Aeroexpresos Ejecutivos, C.A.
Turismo Ejecutivo, C.A. (TE 3000)
Cargo Transportation
Aeroexpresos Encomiendas, C.A.

External links 
 Aeroexpresos Ejecutivos, C.A. 

Transport companies of Venezuela
Conglomerate companies of Venezuela